Streptomyces alkalithermotolerans is an alkaliphilic and thermotolerant bacterium species from the genus Streptomyces which has been isolated from the Lonar soda lake in India.

See also
 List of Streptomyces species

References

Further reading
 

alkalithermotolerans
Bacteria described in 2015